The Bättlihorn is a mountain of the Lepontine Alps, overlooking Mörel in the canton of Valais. It is composed of several summits. The southern summit is 2,992 metres high and the northern summit is 2,951 metres high.

References

External links
 Bättlihorn on Hikr

Mountains of the Alps
Mountains of Switzerland
Mountains of Valais
Lepontine Alps
Two-thousanders of Switzerland